Otis Livingston is a weekday sports anchor at WCBS-TV in New York City and is a sideline reporter on CBS Sports. He has won numerous Emmy Awards.

Biography
Livingston has been with WCBS since 2010.

In New York, he also worked with WNBC-TV. He reported on the NBA Finals, the Stanley Cup Finals, the World Series, the U.S. Open Tennis Championships, the U.S. Open Golf Championship, the Triple Crown, and the New York City Marathon. He also served as anchor and reporter for the Olympics on NBC. He was the sideline reporter for the New York Giants preseason and serves the same capacity for the New York Jets. He works with play-by-play announcer Ian Eagle and color commentator Greg Buttle.

Livingston was also previously a weekend sports anchor and weekday sports reporter for WWOR-TV and WTVO-TV.

While at NBC, Livingston reported for NBC Sports from the 2004 Summer Olympics and the 2006 Winter Olympics. For CBS Sports, Livingston has served as a sideline reporter for SEC on CBS football games and the NCAA tournament.

Personal life
Otis Livingston graduated from the University of Idaho with a Bachelor of Science degree in Telecommunications. He is a member of the Fellowship of Christian Athletes. He is also a member of the New Jersey Music Workshop for the Arts. He lives in New Jersey with his wife and five children.

Livingston spent one season playing point guard for the 1987-88 Kansas Jayhawks men's basketball team.

External links
WCBS-TV anchor page

Idaho Vandals men's basketball players
Television anchors from New York City
American television sports anchors
New York Giants announcers
College football announcers
College basketball announcers in the United States
National Football League announcers
New York Jets announcers
Olympic Games broadcasters
Living people
Date of birth missing (living people)
Year of birth missing (living people)
Kansas Jayhawks men's basketball players
El Camino Warriors athletes
Junior college men's basketball players in the United States